Ellawalakankanamge Asoka Ranjit de Silva (born 28 March 1956) is a Sri Lankan cricketer who played in 10 Test matches and 28 One Day Internationals from 1985 to 1992. Asoka was educated at Isipathana College, Colombo. He later became an umpire.

Umpiring career
De Silva was the first ever Sri Lankan Umpire to be on the Elite Panel of ICC Umpires. He served on the panel between 2002 and 2004 when he was dropped down to the International Panel, but was invited back to the Elite level in April 2008 when the panel was expanded to twelve members.

He continued as a member of the International Panel in the interim period, being used by the ICC to support the Elite Panel during busy periods in the International cricket season.  He umpired in the Cricket World Cup tournaments in 2003, 2007 and 2011. de Silva was moved to less crucial matches during the 2011 Cricket World Cup after a review of his performance. He was not considered to the Elite Panel for the third time in his career after May 2011.

See also
 List of Test cricket umpires
 List of One Day International cricket umpires
 List of Twenty20 International cricket umpires

References

External links

Sri Lankan cricketers
De Silva, Asoka
De Silva, Asoka
Alumni of Isipathana College
De Silva
De Silva
De Silva
De Silva
De Silva
Basnahira North cricketers
De Silva, Asoka